Donald Lee Hall (born March 8, 1969) is an American film director, voice actor and writer at Walt Disney Animation Studios. He is known for co-directing Winnie the Pooh (2011), Big Hero 6 (2014), Moana (2016), and Raya and the Last Dragon (2021). Big Hero 6 won the Academy Award for Best Animated Feature in 2015. Hall made his solo directorial debut in 2022 with Strange World.

Hall is a graduate of the University of Iowa with a bachelor of fine arts degree in drawing and painting.

Filmography

Feature films

Short films

Awards and nominations

Won
 (2015) – Academy Award for Best Animated Feature for Big Hero 6
 (2015) – Visual Effects Society Award for Outstanding Visual Effects in an Animated Feature for Big Hero 6

Nominations
 (2008) – Annie Award for Storyboarding in an Feature Production for Meet the Robinsons
 (2012) – Gold Derby Award for Animated Feature for Winnie the Pooh
 (2012) – Annie Award for Writing in a Feature Production for Winnie the Pooh
 (2012) – Annie Award for Directing in a Feature Production for Winnie the Pooh
 (2015) – Annie Award for Directing in a Feature Production for Big Hero 6
 (2015) – Alliance of Women Film Journalists for Best Animated Film for Big Hero 6
 (2015) – BAFTA Award for Best Animated Film for Big Hero 6
 (2015) – Cinema Bloggers Award, Portugal for Best Animated Film for Big Hero 6
 (2015) – Crítici de Cinema Online Portugueses Award for Best Animated Film for Big Hero 6
 (2015) – Gold Derby Award for Animated Feature for Big Hero 6
 (2017) – Alliance of Women Film Journalists for Best Animated Film for Moana
 (2022) – Academy Award for Best Animated Feature for Raya and the Last Dragon

References

External links
 

1969 births
Living people
American animators
American male screenwriters
American male voice actors
American animated film directors
Animation screenwriters
Male actors from Iowa
People from Glenwood, Iowa
Film directors from Iowa
Directors of Best Animated Feature Academy Award winners
University of Iowa alumni
Walt Disney Animation Studios people